Budget Aviation Holdings is a Singapore-based holding company for a low-cost carrier operating in the Asia-Pacific region, consisting of Scoot.

The holding company was formed on 18 May 2016 to allow for easier management of the airline subsidiaries following the delisting of Tiger Airways from the Singapore stock exchange.

References

Airline holding companies
Holding companies of Singapore
Singaporean companies established in 2016
Singapore Airlines
Temasek Holdings